Heverlee is a town in Belgium. It is a borough of the city of Leuven. Heverlee is bordered by Herent, Bertem, Oud Heverlee and several other municipalities that are part of Leuven (including Leuven proper and Kessel-Lo).

The town is the location of the Heverlee War Cemetery for Commonwealth casualties from the Second World War.

Education

The town also harbours a significant part of the university campus of the Katholieke Universiteit Leuven. The Arenberg campus is the main area for research and educational facilities for exact sciences (The Science, Engineering and Technology Group). These contain the Faculty of Engineering (see Arenberg Château), the Faculty of Bioscience Engineering and the Faculty of Science. A part of the Biomedical Group, namely the Faculty of Kinesiology and Rehabilitation Sciences also has its main facilities on the campus.

The  is another higher education facility with some facilities in Heverlee. It lies next to the Heilig Hart-Instituut, which is a school for secondary education. Also, St John Berchmans University College, Heverlee is situated outside the centre.

Sport

Also situated in Heverlee is the Den Dreef stadium, home of the Belgian 1st Division football team Oud-Heverlee Leuven.

The Cyclocross Leuven is a cyclo-cross race held in January.

Economy
Heverlee also has industrial parks with a variety of companies, some of which are affiliated (as spin-offs) with the university and its research. IMEC, Thrombogenics - now Oxurion and Materialise NV are some of the most important.

The Brabanthal is a large hall, mostly for recreational events.

Gallery

See also
 Arenberg Research-Park

References

External links

Sub-municipalities of Leuven
Populated places in Flemish Brabant